Miloš Savanović (born 18 August 1996) is a Serbian football midfielder who plays for Bečej.

References

External links
 

1996 births
Living people
Sportspeople from Zrenjanin
Association football midfielders
Serbian footballers
FK Proleter Novi Sad players
FK Sloga Temerin players
FK Železničar Pančevo players
OFK Bečej 1918 players
Serbian First League players